Lieutenant-Colonel David Archibald Price-White, TD (5 September 1906 – 6 March 1978) was a Welsh solicitor and Conservative Party politician. He served as the Member of Parliament (MP) for Caernarvon Boroughs from 1945 to 1950.

Early life 
His mother was Charlotte Bell (later Charlotte Price White), a suffrage pioneer, local councillor and activist  while his father, Price Foulkes White (1873–1952) was an engineer at the Bangor Electrical Company and Welsh international footballer. David Price-White was educated in Bangor, first at Friars School and then at the University College of North Wales, before qualifying as a solicitor in 1932. He joined the Territorial Army in 1928  and became a second lieutenant in the Royal Artillery (Territorial Army). By 1939 he had been promoted to Major. During World War II he served with the British Army in France (at Dunkirk), the Middle East, Italy and East Africa. By 1944 he was a Lieutenant Colonel.

Political career 
Price-White was a local councillor in the Caernarfonshire County Council from 1939 until 1941, and also a member of the Bangor City Council.
He was elected at the general election in July 1945 as the MP for Caernarvon Boroughs. His victory by a narrow margin of 336 votes ousted the Liberal MP Seaborne Davies, who had won the seat at a by-election in April that year, after long-serving David Lloyd George had been elevated to the peerage.

When constituency boundaries were revised for the 1950 general election, Price-White stood in the new Conway county constituency, where he was defeated by the Labour Party candidate William Elwyn Jones.

Later career 
Price-White worked as a solicitor until 1956, with a break during the Second World War. In 1957 he was appointed to a position within the national electricity supply industry, as Principal Assistant at the Central Electricity Generating Board, Midland Regions Headquarters. He resumed practice as a solicitor in 1968 until his death in 1978.

Personal life 
In 1934, Price-White married Gwyneth Harris, daughter of James Lewis Harris of Caernarvon and they had two children, a boy (Andrew Stewart) and a girl (Carolyn Mary). The family lived in Colwyn Bay.

He died 6 March 1978.

References

External links
Biography

1906 births
1978 deaths
People educated at Friars School, Bangor
Royal Artillery officers
Conservative Party (UK) MPs for Welsh constituencies
UK MPs 1945–1950
British Army personnel of World War II
Alumni of Bangor University
People from Bangor, Gwynedd
Members of the Parliament of the United Kingdom for Caernarfon